The Central Alliance was a football league in England, covering the East Midlands.

History
The league was established in 1911 with twelve clubs, most of which had previously been members of the Notts & Derbyshire League; Derby County Reserves, Grantham, Grantham Avenue, Ilkeston United, Long Eaton St Helens, Mansfield Mechanics, Mansfield Town, Nottingham Forest Reserves, Peterborough GN Loco, Sutton Junction, Sutton Town and Walsall Reserves.

Following the outbreak of World War I the league was played in two series in 1915–16, with the nine clubs playing each other once; however, three clubs dropped out before the second series, and the remaining six only played nine or ten matches before the league was abandoned. It restarted in 1919–20. However, at the end of the 1924–25 season the league was dissolved, with five clubs joining the Midland League, three joining the Derbyshire Senior League and one joining the Leicestershire Senior League.

In 1947 the league was re-established with 14 clubs. By 1950 it had expanded to the extent that a second division was added. A third division was added in 1956, with Division One split into North and South sections, above Division Two. This system remained in place until 1961 when several clubs moved to the reformed Midland League, and the league reverted to two divisions, a Premier Division and Division One. The following season Division One was divided into A and B sections. However, the two were combined for the 1963–64 season.

The league lost all but four of its Premier Division clubs to the new East Midlands Regional League in 1967. The two leagues subsequently merged to form the Midlands Regional Alliance in 1985.

Divisional champions

References

 
Defunct football leagues in England
1911 establishments in England
1985 disestablishments in England